Miodrag "Sija" Nikolić (22 August 1938 – 17 February 2005) was a Serbian professional basketball player and coach. He represented the Yugoslavia national basketball team internationally.

Playing career 
Nikolić played for OKK Beograd, during their so-called, "Golden Era", in the late 1950s, and the first half of the 1960s, in the Yugoslav First League. Some of his teammates were Radivoj Korać, Slobodan Gordić, Bogomir Rajković, Trajko Rajković, and Milorad Erkić. OKK Beograd's head coaches during that time were Borislav Stanković and Aleksandar Nikolić, and the club's Sports Director was Radomir Šaper. In that period, they won four Yugoslav League championships, and two Yugoslav Cups. During the 1965 Yugoslav League season, Nikolić got injured, at a home game against AŠK Olimpija, and he missed the rest of the season.

After recovering from the injury, Nikolić went to Turkey, where he played for Altınordu Izmir and ITU Istanbul, in the Turkish Super League.

National team career 
Nikolić was a member of the Yugoslavian national basketball team from 1957 to 1964. He played at one FIBA World Cup (1963 in Brazil), and at four EuroBaskets (1957 in Bulgaria, 1959 in Turkey, 1961 in Yugoslavia, and 1963 in Poland). He also played at two Summer Olympics (1960 in Rome, and 1964 in Tokyo). Nikolić won a silver medal at the 1963 FIBA World Championship, as well as a silver medal (1961) and one bronze (1963) at the EuroBasket. He also won a gold medal at the 1959 Mediterranean Games, in Lebanon.

Coaching career 
During his coaching career, Nikolić was the head coach of the senior national teams of Qatar, Bahrain, and Kuwait.

Career achievements 
 Yugoslav League champion: 4 (with OKK Beograd: 1958, 1960, 1963 and 1964).
 Turkish Super League champion: 1 (with ITU Istanbul: 1969–70).
 Yugoslav Cup winner: 2 (with OKK Beograd: 1960, 1962).
 Turkish Cup winner: 2 (with Altınordu: 1968; with ITU Istanbul: 1969).

References

External links
 FIBA Profile
 FIBA Europe Profile
 Miodrag Nikolic at sports-reference.com

1938 births
2005 deaths
Basketball players at the 1960 Summer Olympics
Basketball players at the 1964 Summer Olympics
Serbian men's basketball players
Serbian men's basketball coaches
Basketball players from Belgrade
KK Crvena zvezda assistant coaches
OKK Beograd players
Olympic basketball players of Yugoslavia
Yugoslav basketball coaches
Yugoslav men's basketball players
1963 FIBA World Championship players
BKK Radnički players
Serbian expatriate basketball people in Bahrain
Serbian expatriate basketball people in Germany
Serbian expatriate basketball people in Kuwait
Serbian expatriate basketball people in Turkey
Serbian expatriate basketball people in Qatar
Competitors at the 1959 Mediterranean Games
Mediterranean Games gold medalists for Yugoslavia
Mediterranean Games medalists in basketball
Place of death missing